Thomas Wagner (9 October 1976 – 15 March 2023) was an Austrian professional footballer who played as a forward, spending the majority of his career with SV Mattersburg.

Death
Wagner died on 15 March 2023, at the age of 46.

References

1976 births
2023 deaths
Austrian footballers
Footballers from Vienna
Association football forwards
Austrian Football Bundesliga players
TSV Hartberg players
SV Stegersbach players
SV Mattersburg players